Edmund Ross Whitehead (19 April 1934 – 4 October 1999) was an English professional golfer. His most successful year was 1962 when he won the Wentworth Foursomes, Sunningdale Foursomes and the Gor-Ray Cup, tied for 12th in the 1962 Open Championship and reached the final of the News of the World Match Play. His only win in a major tournament was the 1972 John Player Trophy.

Golf career
While an assistant at Walton Heath Golf Club, Whitehead won the 1958 Coombe Hill Assistants' Tournament. In 1962 he moved to Banstead Downs Golf Club and won the Gor-Ray Cup, the Assistants' Championship, by 6 strokes.

In 1972, at the age of 38, he won his first major tournament, the John Player Trophy, and the first prize of £1,500.

He was joint runner-up in the 1984 Trusthouse Forte PGA Seniors Championship, 3 strokes behind Ernie Jones.

Whitehead was the Captain of the PGA from 1993 to 1995.

Professional wins (6)

European Tour wins (1)

Other wins (5)
1957 Sunningdale Foursomes (with Brian Huggett)
1958 Coombe Hill Assistants' Tournament
1962 Wentworth Foursomes (with Martin Christmas), Sunningdale Foursomes (with Neil Coles), Gor-Ray Cup

Results in major championships

Note: Whitehead only played in The Open Championship.

CUT = missed the half-way cut
"T" indicates a tie for a place

References

External links

English male golfers
European Tour golfers
European Senior Tour golfers
1934 births
1999 deaths